The Marathi Wikipedia is the Marathi language edition of Wikipedia, a free and publicly editable online encyclopedia, and was launched on 1 May 2003. The project is one of the leading Wikipedia among other South Asian language Wikipedia's in various quality matrices. It has grown on to become a wiki containing more than 80,000 articles.

Among the most visited Marathi-language websites, the Marathi Wikipedia is ranked tenth by Alexa.

History

Beginning
The Marathi Wikipedia was available in the wikipedia.org domain from 2003 May 1. 'Vasant Panchami'(वसंत पंचमी) (Vasant Panchami) and 'Audumbar' (औदुंबर (कविता)), a poem by the poet Balkavi were the first articles created on Marathi Wikipedia on 2 May 2003.

Initial growth phase
The Marathi Wikipedia picked up growth from 2006 onwards. On 13 January 2006 Marathi Wikipedia had 1500 articles.

On 27 February, Marathi Day is celebrated.

Progress

Users and editors

Community and events 

The Marathi Wikipedia has various events organised by volunteers from all over the state. Some of the notable events include,
 Marathi Wikipedia Vachan Prerna Saptah
 Wikipedia Asian Month
 Marathi Bhasha Gaurav Din etc.

Media coverage and increased growth 
Marathi Daily news paper Maharashtra Times was the first to cover and recommend 'Marathi language Wikipedia' on 27 July 2006.

Fonts and input methods 

Any one of Unicode Marathi fonts input system is fine for Marathi Wikipedia. Some people use inscript. Majority uses either Google phonetic transliteration or input facility Universal Language Selector provided on Marathi Wikipedia. Phonetic facility provided initially was java-based later supported by Narayam extension for phonetic input facility. Currently Marathi Wikipedia is supported by Universal Language Selector (ULS), that offers both phonetic keyboard (Aksharantaran, Marathi: अक्षरांतरण) and InScript keyboard (Marathi: मराठी लिपी).

See also 
 Konkani Wikipedia

References

External links 

  Main page
  Marathi Wikipedia mobile version
  Help:Extension:UniversalLanguageSelector/Input methods/mr-transliteration

Marathi encyclopedias
Wikipedias by language
Marathi-language mass media
Articles containing video clips
Internet properties established in 2003
2003 establishments in India
Wikipedia in India